Paul Griffiths is Professor of Philosophy at the University of Sydney and works primarily in the Philosophy of Science and more particularly Philosophy of Biology. Born in England in 1962, he received a B.A. from the University of Cambridge in 1984 and a Ph.D. in philosophy from the Australian National University in 1989 under the supervision of Kim Sterelny. He taught previously at the University of Pittsburgh, the University of Queensland and the University of Otago. He spends part of each year at the University of Exeter in the Egenis: the Centre for the Study of the Life Sciences. Griffiths is a Fellow of the American Association for the Advancement of Science and of the Australian Academy of the Humanities.

Griffiths, together with Russell Gray developed a theoretical perspective on biological development, heredity, and evolution known as developmental systems theory (DST).

Together with his former advisor Kim Sterelny, in 1999, Griffiths published Sex and Death, a comprehensive treatment of problems and alternative positions in the philosophy of biology. This book incorporated a number of the positions developed in previous articles on the range of topics in the philosophy of biology.

His latest book, published in 2013, in collaboration with Karola Stotz, focuses on the philosophy of genetics.

Books

Monographs 
 Griffiths, P. E. (1997). What Emotions Really Are: The Problem of Psychological Categories. Chicago, University of Chicago Press.
 Sterelny, K. and P. E. Griffiths (1999) Sex and Death: An Introduction to the Philosophy of Biology. Chicago, University of Chicago Press.
 Griffiths, P. E., & Stotz, K. (2013). Genetics and Philosophy: An introduction. New York: Cambridge University Press.

Edited Volumes 
 Griffiths, P.E (Ed.) (1992). Trees of Life: Essays in Philosophy of Biology. Dordrecht, Kluwer. 
 Oyama, S., P. E. Griffiths and R.D. Gray (Eds.) (2001). Cycles of Contingency: Developmental Systems and Evolution. MIT Press.

Awards and honors 
In 2017, he was awarded an Australian Laureate Fellowship.

References

Australian philosophers
Living people
1962 births
Alumni of the University of Cambridge
Australian National University alumni
Philosophers of biology